Gjini Beg is a peak in the Sharr Mountains found on the boundary between Kosovo and North Macedonia.

Notes and references

Notes:

References:

Šar Mountains
Two-thousanders of North Macedonia
Two-thousanders of Kosovo